The Town Hall Theatre is a theatre in Galway, Ireland.

History
The building which houses the Town Hall Theatre was erected in the 1820s and served first as a courthouse and later as a town hall. In the 1950s, the building was converted into a cinema and was used for film screenings until it fell into disrepair in the 1990s. Galway Corporation (now Galway City Council), with the assistance of a grant from the Department of Arts, Culture and the Gaeltacht, undertook a major refurbishment of the building between 1993–95 and it reopened as a state of the art, 393-seat Municipal Theatre in October 14th 1995 with a production of "Chess" by the Patrician Musical Society.

The venue attracts audiences in excess of 100,000 annually (close to 2 million since being officially re-opened on 1st February 1996) making it the most successful theatre of its size in Ireland.

It is used as a venue for several festivals annually including Cúirt International Festival of Literature, Galway International Arts Festival, Galway Film Fleadh and more. Charlie Byrne's hosts a pop-up bookshop there each year during Cúirt.

External links
Official site

References

Buildings and structures in Galway (city)
Theatres in the Republic of Ireland
Tourist attractions in Galway (city)